St. Louis, Iron Mountain and Southern Railroad Depot may refer to 

Any railroad station built by the St. Louis, Iron Mountain and Southern Railway

or specific notable ones
(by state then city)
Glenwood Iron Mountain Railroad Depot, Glenwood, AR, listed on the NRHP in Arkansas
 St. Louis, Iron Mountain and Southern Railroad Depot (Olyphant, Arkansas)
 St. Louis, Iron Mountain and Southern Railroad Depot (Fredericktown, Missouri), listed on the NRHP in Missouri
 St. Louis, Iron Mountain and Southern Railroad Depot (Gad's Hill, Missouri)
 St. Louis, Iron Mountain and Southern Railroad Depot (Jackson, Missouri)
 St. Louis, Iron Mountain and Southern Railroad Depot (Poplar Bluff, Missouri), listed on the NRHP in Missouri
 Sikeston St. Louis, Iron Mountain and Southern Railway Depot, Sikeston, MO, listed on the NRHP in Missouri